Elko is a double live album by the American band Railroad Earth. It was released in 2006 by Sugar Hill Records. It is the band's first official live album, and fourth album overall. Elko showcases the band's improvisational live performance style, as noted by Allmusic: "The question of whether or not Railroad Earth can jam, if it was really in doubt, is swiftly answered on [this] 126-minute collection of 12 songs, five of which run over ten minutes each."

The album was recorded during the band's spring 2005 tour. It marks the first official release of "The Hunting Song," "Old Man and the Land," "Elko" and "Warhead Boogie," songs which had previously only been available on fan-traded live show audience recordings. With the success of Elko, Railroad Earth began releasing complete concert recordings in physical and digital formats following the model established by The Grateful Dead and Phish. The band also permits recordings done by live audio tapers to be made freely available on the Internet Archive.

Track listing
Disc One
 "Long Way to Go" (Sheaffer) - 6:20 
 "Colorado" (Goessling, Sheaffer) - 9:26 
 "Bird in a House" (Sheaffer) - 7:22 
 "The Hunting Song" (Fitzsimmons, Rymer, Sheaffer) - 11:56 
 "Old Man and the Land" (Calabrese, Sheaffer) - 6:57 
 "Head" (Sheaffer) - 15:41 
Disc Two
 "Elko" (Sheaffer) - 8:59 
 "Mighty River" (Sheaffer, Skehan) - 7:54 
 "Like a Buddha" (Carbone, Sheaffer, VonDollen) - 16:00 
 "Warhead Boogie" (Sheaffer) - 15:05 
 "Railroad Earth" (Sheaffer) - 6:00 
 "Seven Story Mountain" (Sheaffer) - 14:10

Note: the limited edition Japan release of Elko includes the bonus track "Luxury Liner" on Disc One.

Personnel 
Railroad Earth
Tim Carbone - violin, vocals 
Andy Goessling - banjo, dobro, flute, guitar, mandolin, vocals, tin whistle 
Johnny Grubb - bass, vocals
Carey Harmon - drums, vocals
Todd Sheaffer - guitar, vocals
John Skehan - mandolin, vocals

Production
Package and layout design - Mark Berger 
Mastered by - Fred Kevorkian
Mixed by - John Skehan, Johnny Grubb, Todd Sheaffer
Recorded by - Johnny Grubb, Mike Partridge

References

External links
Railroad Earth official website

Railroad Earth albums
2006 live albums
Sugar Hill Records live albums